"The Tachypomp" is a short story by Edward Page Mitchell originally published January 1874 anonymously in The Sun, a New York City daily newspaper. It was Mitchell's first science-fiction story. Mitchell was known for his editorial work on The Sun, but because his science-fiction stories were published anonymously, his well-regarded work was mostly forgotten until its rediscovery in the early 1970s.

"The Tachypomp" is an early use of mathematics as the principal premise of a science-fiction story, and it was one of the first to use the word "android", here used to describe a purely mechanical creature.

Publishing information
After the original publication in The Sun, the story was reprinted in Clifton Fadiman's Fantasia Mathematica (1958). In 1973, "The Tachypomp" and other stories were reprinted in The Crystal Man: Landmark Science Fiction, edited by Sam Moskowitz.

Plot synopsis
The plot revolves around Mr. Furnace’s (the narrator) quest to marry his math professor’s daughter. Unfortunately, the math teacher does not approve of him, as he does not excel in mathematics. The professor sets him a challenge: to discover the principle of infinite speed. The narrator turns to his tutor, and is able to find the solution in the tachypomp. Eventually the professor agrees to allow Mr. Furnace to marry his daughter.

The tutor tells Furnace about several scientific discoveries. These include:
 an android capable of computing vulgar fractions and composing sonnets;
 a hollow tube leading through the earth to the Kerguelen Islands (where a Dutch navigator Rhuyghens is said to have found an "abysmal pit");
 a solution to squaring the circle;
 a perpetual motion machine;
 the tachypomp.

Tachypomp

The term "tachypomp" refers to a fictional device theoretically capable of attaining infinite speed. The machine itself is a series of trains (or any train-like vehicle) each half the length of the preceding, stacked vertically. The trains would thus move in tandem, and their speeds would be added to find the speed of the train on top. For instance, if the bottom train were moving 40 miles an hour and the train above that 40 miles an hour, then the speed of the higher train would be 80 miles an hour.

Though an interesting idea in theory, the special theory of relativity dictates that the speed of light in a vacuum is absolute and represents an ultimate speed limit for the universe (at least locally). If a Tachypomp were constructed, relativistic principles such as length contraction and time dilation would prevent any component of the system from achieving or exceeding the speed of light.

The final line of the story, "Still I can see no reason why the Tachypomp should not have succeeded. Can you?" would be addressed thirty years later, when these relativistic effects were laid out by Albert Einstein in 1905.

References

External links
The Tachypomp and other stories by Edward Page Mitchell

1874 short stories
American short stories
Fictional trains
Faster-than-light travel in fiction